Jean-Christophe Coubronne (born 30 July 1989) is a French footballer who plays as a defender for Finnish club Mariehamn. Besides France, he has played in Italy, Portugal, and Finland.

Career

FC Lahti
On 27 November 2018, FC Lahti announced the signing of Coubronne for the 2019 season.

Mariehamn
On 18 January 2022, he joined Mariehamn for the 2022 season.

References

External links

1989 births
Living people
Footballers from Lyon
French footballers
Association football defenders
FC Sochaux-Montbéliard players
Serie A players
Serie B players
Novara F.C. players
S.C. Olhanense players
Kotkan Työväen Palloilijat players
FC Lahti players
IFK Mariehamn players
Primeira Liga players
Liga Portugal 2 players
Ykkönen players
Veikkausliiga players
French expatriate footballers
Expatriate footballers in Italy
French expatriate sportspeople in Italy
Expatriate footballers in Portugal
French expatriate sportspeople in Portugal
Expatriate footballers in Finland
French expatriate sportspeople in Finland